Celebrity Big Brother 2010, also known as Celebrity Big Brother 7, was the seventh series of the British reality television series Celebrity Big Brother and the final series aired on Channel 4 and E4. It began on Sunday 3 January 2010 and aired for 27 days until the final on 29 January 2010, making it the longest Channel 4 series of Celebrity Big Brother. The series launched with 6.7 million viewers and became the most watched series of Big Brother UK since the eighth regular series in 2007, averaging 3.7 million viewers per night.

Davina McCall returned as main presenter, also hosting Big Brother's Big Mouth. George Lamb returned to present Big Brother's Little Brother. The show was sponsored by the bed retailer Dreams, who also sponsored the previous celebrity series.

Alex Reid won the show with 65.9% of the final vote, hence becoming the final Channel 4 Celebrity Big Brother winner. No housemates from this series appeared in Ultimate Big Brother later on in the year.

Pre-series
A Celebrity Big Brother 7 pre-series special show, Top 20 Celebrity Big Brother Moments, featured the series' most memorable moments of the show according to viewers who have voted online. The show aired on E4 on 28 December 2009. Within the special, the new graphics for the upcoming series were introduced.

On 13 December 2009, the first trailer was aired on Channel 4, during a screening of film Elf. A hell theme, similar to that of Big Brother 2004 and Big Brother 2008 was hinted with a tagline in the trailer that said: "Hell Lies in Others". Five days later on 18 December 2009, the first full 30-second long trailer was aired, with the eye present.

Channel 4 has announced that it will resume its tradition of donating some of its income made from the premium-rate telephone lines; votes will be increased to 50p (an increase from 35p), with 15p going to Comic Relief and the donations from the phone votes from 16 January 2010 to the finale will go to support the relief efforts in Haiti following the recent earthquake.

Eye
The eye logo was revealed on 14 December 2009 on the Channel 4 website. It is the first time that the logo has been based on a real eye since series one in 2000. It is also the first time ever that the Celebrity Big Brother eye was not based on the eye from the summer series before it.

House
Official images of the House's entrance, living area, kitchen, and the bathroom were released on the show's website on 29 December 2009. This was the first time that a brand new house was used for a celebrity series. Usually, Celebrity Big Brother uses the same house as the summer series which preceded it. The main entrance has red paint covering the walls, with black carpet covering the floor. The entrance to the diary room resembles a fiery inferno. Going inside the main House, a luxurious red carpet covers the whole room, with black and gold walls. Gilded panels were a new installment in the ceiling. A brand new velvet seating area and dining table finished the whole area. The kitchen was also given a big makeover, similar to a restaurant kitchen, but reportedly based upon an autopsy laboratory. The bathroom's colours for this series varies a little from the "hell" theme given, as the colours in the room are a cream blue. As well, a snug was installed in the garden, complete with two couches, throws, and a fireplace. Also installed in the garden was a tree known as the Tree of Temptation, who would give housemates secret tasks to complete to get a luxury prize. Executive producer Shirley Jones stated that the house was heavily based on Dante's Inferno and the quote "Abandon hope all ye who enter here." She has also stated as well that the house was influenced by the quote "Hell is other people" by Jean-Paul Sartre; the house lacks any private quarters for the housemates to be in solitude.

Housemates

Alex Reid
Alex Reid (born 21 July 1975) is an English professional mixed martial arts fighter, best known for being the then-boyfriend (now ex-husband) of Katie Price following her split from Peter Andre. He won the show on Day 27 with 65.9% of the public vote.

Dane Bowers
Dane Bowers (born 29 November 1979) is an English R&B singer, songwriter and record producer. Most famous for being one of the founder members of Another Level who had a UK number 1 single in 1998. He finished in second place.

Heidi Fleiss
Heidi Fleiss (born 30 December 1965) is an American "Hollywood Madam". Heidi was the second housemate to be evicted on Day 13 with 28.6% of the vote.

Ivana Trump
Ivana Trump (20 February 1949 — 14 July 2022) the former wife of Donald Trump, was a Czech-American fashion model and socialite. Ivana escaped the double eviction on Day 20 with only 21% of the total vote and was the only female housemate to survive a public vote against male housemates. On Day 25, she was evicted from the House as she had the fewest votes to win (5.74%).

Jonas Altberg
Jonas Altberg, better known as Basshunter (born 22 December 1984), is a Swedish record producer and singer-songwriter/DJ, active since 1998. He finished in fourth.

Katia Ivanova
Ekaterina "Katia" Ivanova (born 13 August 1988) is a Kazakhstani-born Russian model known for being the ex-girlfriend of The Rolling Stones' Ronnie Wood. She was, with 44% of the vote, the first housemate to be evicted on Day 13.

Lady Sovereign
Lady Sovereign aka Sov (born 19 December 1985) is an English rapper and grime artist. She narrowly escaped the first eviction with only 27.4% of the total vote on Day 13 but she was evicted three days later with 69.5% of the vote.

Nicola Tappenden
Nicola Tappenden, also known as Nicola T (born 2 December 1982), is an English Page 3 Girl, and glamour model. She was evicted on Day 25. After her eviction, 'Nicola T' was replaced in the Big Brother House by Davina McCall, on the 25th Day as part of a twist.

Sisqó
Mark Althavean Andrews, known by his stage name Sisqó (born 9 November 1978), is an American R&B singer, best known for his hit single Thong Song in 2000. He was the fifth person to be evicted with 29% of the public vote on Day 20.

Stephanie Beacham
Stephanie Beacham (born 28 February 1947) is an English actress, best known for her role as Sable Colby in the ABC soap operas Dynasty and The Colbys. Stephanie left in fifth place in the final with 8.6% of the vote to win.

Stephen Baldwin
Stephen Baldwin (born 12 May 1966) is an American actor, the youngest of the Baldwin brothers. He was the fourth person to be evicted with 50% of the public vote on Day 20.

Vinnie Jones
Vinnie Jones (born 5 January 1965) is a British film actor and former footballer. He finished in third place.

Weekly summary

Nominations table

Notes

Ratings
Ratings are provided by BARB.

Controversy

Boy George legal exclusion
Originally intended by the producers as one of the housemates, Boy George (George Alan O'Dowd) had his request to appear on the final series of Celebrity Big Brother turned down by the Probation Service. O'Dowd was convicted in January 2009 for false imprisonment after he handcuffed a Norwegian man to a wall in his east London home. He was sentenced to 15 months imprisonment. Released from prison in May 2009 on licence from Her Majesty's Prison Service, various conditions were applied to his licence conditions, which terminated in April 2010. O'Dowd applied to the High Court for judicial review of the National Probation Service's decision to refuse his request to reside in the Big Brother house and not to report to his probation officer during his time in the house (or alternatively for the probation officer to meet him in the Big Brother house). Richard Clayton QC, representing the Probation Service, said O'Dowd's participation would pose "a high level of risk" to the service's reputation. Mr Clayton argued that if he used the show to promote his status as a celebrity and earn "a lucrative sum of money" it could undermine public confidence in the criminal justice system. The judge accepted that the Probation Service's decision was not unreasonable, meaning that O'Dowd could not appear.

Ableism

During 29 January broadcast of Big Brother's Big Mouth, Vinnie Jones accused Davina McCall of 'walking like a retard', McCall responded by laughing and Jones then mimed what he meant. Despite immediate protests by disability charities, individual disabled people and a Facebook campaign, Channel 4 initially responded "It is important that within the context and structure of the programme that participants have the right to express themselves without censure". It was not until 12 February that Channel 4 removed the incident from its on-demand service 4oD and issued an apology, blaming the failure on the 'tiredness' of production staff. Jones and McCall issued apologies via their respective publicists at around the same time. The tardiness of the response drew unfavourable comment from disability groups, particularly following Channel 4's action in the Celebrity Big Brother 5 racism incident, where contestants were warned over their conduct.

Kerry Katona's planned participation

Atomic Kitten member and television personality Kerry Katona was asked to appear in the series and accepted the offer. Katona was reportedly expected to be paid £250,000 to appear on the show and was hoping to use the money to get her out of financial troubles and use the appearance to relaunch her career and public image after years of negative media coverage. However, Katona failed the psychiatric assessments that all potential participants have to go through to ensure they can cope with confinement in the house. The reason for her failure of the tests was down to her bipolar disorder, with the psychiatrists deeming her "unfit" to enter the house.

Katona finally entered the Big Brother House on 18 August 2011 for Channel 5's first series of Celebrity Big Brother.

References

External links
 Official website
 

2010 British television seasons
07